TBO may refer to:
 TBO (comics), a long-running Spanish comic book magazine
 IATA airport code for Tabora Airport
 Time between overhaul, a measure of an aircraft engine's overall economics
 Total benefits of ownership
 Operation Assistance Force (Tenaga Bantuan Operasi) of Indonesian National Armed Forces
 Toluidine blue O, a purple-staining chemical used clinically and for histology
 TBO.com, the website for The Tampa Tribune newspaper for Florida